Eoophyla nigerialis is a moth in the family Crambidae first described by George Hampson in 1906. It is found in Cameroon and Nigeria.

The wingspan is 12–13 mm. The forewings are fuscous with a pale subbasal fascia and a suffused discal spot. There are two white costal strigulae towards the apex, separated by orange. The base of the hindwings is whitish with an orange subbasal fascia, suffused with fuscous.

References

Eoophyla
Moths of Africa